WWBM (89.7 FM) was a radio station formerly licensed to Yates, Georgia, United States. The station was owned by Best Media, Inc. The station broadcast from its transmitter near Georgia Power's Eugene A. Yates Plant south of Whitesburg.

History
The station went on the air as WWBM on 1999-05-20.

The station's license was cancelled and its call sign deleted by the Federal Communications Commission per the licensee's request on January 3, 2012.

References

WBM
Radio stations disestablished in 2012
Defunct radio stations in the United States
2012 disestablishments in Georgia (U.S. state)
Radio stations established in 1999
1999 establishments in Georgia (U.S. state)
WBM